Hussain Bakhsh Khadim (15 January 1930 - 12 March 1992) also spelt as Hussain Bux Khadim, was a Sindhi language folk singer and poet.

Biography 
Hussain Bakhsh was born on 15 January 1930 at Arazi, district Jamshoro, Sindh, Pakistan. His father's name was Pir Bakhsh Bhanger. He only studied four classes in the primary school of his village. He spent his childhood in the company of noble elders, literary persons, and scholars of his village, so he remained inclined towards music and poetry for whole life. He started singing in social gatherings, marriage ceremonies, shrines and local festivals at an early age. He was devoted to renowned poet and spiritual leader Makhdoom Muhammad Zaman Talibul Maula. Hussain Bakhsh's passion for poetry flourished in his (Makhdoom's) company. In the beginning, he used to sing Makhdoom Sahib's poetry, afterwards he started composing his own poetry. Makhdoom Talibul Maula proposed Khadim (servant) as his penname. Makhdoom was his teacher, mentor and spiritual leader who used to improve his poetry.

Hussain Bakhsh Khadim started singing at Radio Pakistan Karachi in 1955. In the same year, Radio Pakistan Hyderabad was established where he became a popular singer of whole Sindh province. He performed in many countries including Germany, Italy, Holland, France and USA. He also served as playback singer in Sindhi film Tuhinjoon Galihyoon Sajjan (Sindhi: تنھنجون ڳالھيون سڄڻ).

Death 
Hussain Bakhsh Khadim died on 12 March 1992 at the Shrine of Muhammad Faquir Khatian at village Sulaiman Khatian. He was buried in his native village Arazi.

References 

Sindhi-language singers
Sindhi people
Singers from Sindh
Pakistani folk singers
20th-century Pakistani male singers
People from Jamshoro District
1930 births
1992 deaths